James Jervis Blomfield (1879-1951) was an English-born Canadian artist and designer. He is best known for his design of the coat of arms of Vancouver and as a pioneer in the field of stained glass art in Canada, with an extensive body of works completed in British Columbia and Ontario, including the Beechwood Cemetery Mausoleum in Canada's national cemetery in Ottawa. He lived in Toronto for the last 30 years of his life.

Background
He was born James Alfred Bloomfield in Maidenhead, Berkshire, England. The middle name he added from his mother's maiden name later in life when he also dropped the second 'o' in Bloomfield. He was born deaf and worked for a period of time as a junior draftsman. before moving with his family to Canada, to Calgary, Alberta in 1887. In Calgary, he studied painting and engraving (1887, 1889). His father Henry Bloomfield was an artist and engraver and the family lived in Calgary, then moved to New Westminster, British Columbia. There in 1890, Henry established the first art glass studio in British Columbia which he ran with his sons James and Charles, later moving the operation to Vancouver in 1899. James Blomfield attracted the attention of Lord Aberdeen who paid for his art education in England and Belgium.

Foundations & work
On his return to Canada, his career flourished with such commissions as Holy Trinity Cathedral, New Westminster, St. Paul's Anglican Church in Vancouver, Gabriola, the home of Benjamin Tingley, and the original Rogers Window at Government House in Victoria (destroyed by fire in 1957).

Together with Robert McKay Fripp, S.M. Everleigh, and A. Woodroffe, in 1900 he co-founded the Arts and Crafts Association of Vancouver, which later became the Studio Club (1904) and finally the British Columbia Society of Fine Arts (1908).

Some time after the turn of the century, he moved to Washington State and later to Chicago where he became professor of design at the Chicago Academy of Fine Art. In 1918 he worked for the Christian Science Monitor as a staff writer.

Final years
By 1922, he had removed to Toronto where he would spend his final years. He died after being struck by an automobile in downtown Toronto at the age of 72. He was married in 1903 to Mary Augusta Diamond of Belleville, Ontario, who predeceased him in 1930. They had no children. Their remains are interred at the Hamilton (now Bayview) Mausoleum in Hamilton, Ontario; the stained glass windows of the mausoleum were designed by Blomfield in the 1920s.

Recognition
In 1982, a plaque commemorating Blomfield was unveiled at the Hamilton Mausoleum. There is a plaque on his former home at W 10th Ave & Columbia St, in Vancouver. Blomfield's name is included on the official list of potential Vancouver street names. He was a member of the Ontario Society of Artists.

References

External links
 James Jervis Blomfield  at Illustrated Vancouver
 The Vancouver Archives holds the Bloomfield Family fonds, containing much material about Blomfield and his work.
 The Andrew Merrilees collection of the Ontario Provincial Archives contains a collection of Blomfield works.

1879 births
1951 deaths
People from Maidenhead
Artists from British Columbia
Artists from Ontario
Heraldic artists
Canadian stained glass artists and manufacturers
19th-century Canadian artists
Canadian male artists
20th-century Canadian artists
Canadian designers
Road incident deaths in Canada
Pedestrian road incident deaths
Accidental deaths in Ontario
19th-century Canadian male artists
20th-century Canadian male artists